Urdu is the fourth most commonly spoken language in the United Kingdom. According to the 2021 census, 270,000 people (0.5% of UK residents) listed Urdu as their main language. Ethnologue reports the total number of Urdu speakers in the UK at over 400,000.

Urdu Periodicals of UK
In the 1990s, some weekly, fortnightly, and monthly Urdu language periodicals were once published from the UK.

Challenges
Britain's Anglophone tradition and inheritance centralises English as the national lingua and vernacular. Radical opportunities exist however for the productive growth of minority Commonwealth migrant languages such as Urdu and Punjabi, particularly in curriculum-based education, for instance students in the UK are able to take Urdu as a GCSE subject.

Use in politics
When Pakistani-origin Scottish MSP Bashir Ahmad was elected to the Scottish parliament in 2007, he took his oath in both English and Urdu. Queen Victoria was taught to write Urdu by her Indian Muslim servant Abdul Karim.

See also
 List of English words of Hindi or Urdu origin
 Glossary of the British Raj
 Punjabi language writers in the United Kingdom
 Languages of the United Kingdom
 Bo Kata
 Cinema of the United Kingdom
 BBC Urdu

References

Further reading
 
 

Languages of the Pakistani diaspora
Languages of the Indian diaspora